Ebright Creek Park is a  neighborhood park located alongside the Ebright Creek Watershed in the city of Sammamish, Washington, United States. It has areas for different types of activities, despite being built near wetland buffers and sensitive areas.

Sports park
At the front of the park, and adjacent to the parking lot, the sports park offers the following activities:
 Tennis
 Basketball
 Street hockey
 Handball

The sports park also contains several picnic tables, a small climbing wall and a play lawn.

Playground and picnic area

At the center of the park is a large picnic area, which includes both sheltered and unsheltered tables, as well as a large grass lawn and two children's play areas. One play area has equipment designated for children between 5 and 12 years of age, while the other has equipment designated for children 5 and younger. Restrooms are also located next to the picnic area.

Wetland and sensitive areas

Near the front of the park, a wetland boardwalk crosses a sensitive area between the parking lot and the picnic area. At the back of the park, a walking trail crosses over the recently restored Ebright creek. The creek is of high environment value as it is the only remaining salmon-bearing creek in Sammamish. The creek is currently known to support coho and sockeye salmon, coastal cutthroat and rainbow trout.

External links

Ebright Creek Park

Parks in Sammamish, Washington
Parks in King County, Washington